Ulfat Idlibi (November 1912, Damascus – 21 March 2007, Paris) was a Syrian novel writer. She wrote books that became best sellers in the Arabic-speaking world, such as "Dimashq ya Basimat el Huzn" ("Damascus - the Smile of Sadness", 1980), which was translated into many languages and filmed as "Basimat al Huzn" (TV series).

Biography 
Born in 1912, to a traditional Damascene family, she was married at the age of 17. She was affected by the French occupation of Syria (French Mandate, 1919), and educated herself by reading widely from the books in the library of her uncle, Kazem Daghestani, who was also an author. Then Ulfat began to write and publish stories about the area of Damascus called Salhiya in 1954. Her books tell of strong women. She wrote about the Syrian resistance movement, especially regarding the injustice of the aggressor and people who were involved in a struggle for their lives, freedom and the independence of their country (which was already exhausted by rule of Ottoman Empire).

Later she became a lecturer and wrote novels and essays on the social position of women in the Middle East, as well as on the pressure they undergo and the suffering they endure. Ulfat emphasized the theme of women often spending time in their own, non-existent worlds.

She has a daughter and two sons.

She spent the last decades of her life between Damascus and Paris, where she died in 2007.

Damascus - the Smile of Sadness 
This is the most famous novel by Ulfat Idlibi, telling a story about a girl who grows up in times of nationwide chaos (1920s), caused by the French occupation. She becomes more conscious of her national identity, which is hardly supported by her family, who is conservative and does not allow Sabriya to leave the house except to go to school. The story tells of the injustices  and deprivations she undergoes, caused both by the French occupiers and by her family, along with the loss of her beloved and her vow never to forget him. It's been read as left by Sabriyeh (main character) in her diary, found after her death.

Under many circumstances, most of aspects included are authors vision of reality, which Ulfat was a witness to, therefore should be considered as dramatized history.

Bibliography

Novels
 "القرار الأخي" // (1947) - "the Last Decision"
 "قصص شامي" // (1954) - "Levantine Stories"
 "وداعاً يا دمشق" // (1963) - "Goodbye, Damascus!"
 "يضحك الشيطان" // (1974) - "The Laugh of the Devil"
 "نظرة في أدبنا الشعبي" // (1974) - "Reflections on our Popular Literature"
 "عصي الدمع" // (1976) - "Mutiny of Tears"
 "دمشق يا بسمة الحزن" // (1981) - "Damascus - the Smile of Sadness"
 "نفحات دمشقي" // (1990) - "the Fragrances of Damascus"
 "حكاية جدي" // (1999) - "Story of My Grandfather"

References

1912 births
2007 deaths
Syrian emigrants to France
Syrian women novelists
Syrian novelists
Writers from Damascus
20th-century novelists
20th-century women writers
20th-century Syrian women writers
20th-century Syrian writers
21st-century Syrian women writers
21st-century Syrian writers